Swaroop Khan is an Indian playback folk singer from Rajasthan
He is known for his popular songs "Tharki Chokro" in PK and Ghoomar in Padmaavat.
He had contested in the Indian Idol Season 5.

Discography

Hindi songs

Kannada songs

References

People from Jodhpur
Living people
Bollywood playback singers
Indian male playback singers
People from Jaisalmer
1991 births